Diego de Colmenares (26 July 1586 – 29 January 1651) was a Spanish historian and writer. He wrote Historia de la insigne Ciudad de Segovia y compendio de las historias de Castilla.

References 

Spanish male writers
People from Segovia
1586 births
1651 deaths
University of Salamanca alumni
Spanish historians